Philip Anthony Taylor (born 11 July 1958) is an English former professional footballer who played as a winger in the Football League for York City and Darlington, in non-League football for Woodland Rangers and Guisborough Town and was on the books of Lincoln City without making a league appearance.

References

1958 births
Living people
Footballers from Sheffield
English footballers
Association football wingers
York City F.C. players
Darlington F.C. players
Lincoln City F.C. players
Guisborough Town F.C. players
English Football League players